Laris may refer to:
 the plural of Lari (several meanings)
 Laris (moth), synonym of the moth genus Parastenolechia 
 Le Laris, part of Saint-Christophe-et-le-Laris, a commune in France
 Tom Laris, American athlete

See also 
 Larix, a genus of conifers
 Lares (disambiguation)